The Corbet School is a mixed secondary school located in Baschurch in the English county of Shropshire.

Originally known as Baschurch Secondary Modern School, later the school became comprehensive and went on to gain specialist status as a Technology College. In September 2011 The Corbet School converted to academy status.

The Corbet School offers GCSEs and Cambridge Nationals as programmes of study for pupils.

Lessons 
All Year 7 pupils will be allocated a language to study (French or Spanish).  They will study this language for the rest of school resulting in a GCSE qualification at the end of Year 11.

All pupils in Years 7-9 will study:

 English
 Maths
 Science (Physics, Biology, and Chemistry)
 French or Spanish
 History
 Geography
 Personal, Social Health & Economic Education
 Physical Education
 Religious Education
 Design Technology (Product Design, Textiles and Food)
 Art and Design
 Music
 Drama
 Information & Communication Technology.

At the End of Year 9 all students are required to take:
Maths
English (Language and Literature)
Combined Science
French or Spanish

But Must also choose three of the following in the Spring Term of Year 9 for their GCSEs:
Physical Education
Design And Technology 
Engineering
Art and Design
Religious Studies
Triple Science
Geography
History
Music
PE
Drama
Computer Science
Creative iMedia
Health and Social Care
Hospitality and Catering
As well as these, KS4 students also have PSHE and PE lessons that do not reward a GCSE qualification.

Some pupils will do Literacy as opposed to French or Spanish.

Attendance statistics 
Academic Year 2018-19

The overall percentage attendance: 95.05%

The overall percentage of unauthorised absence in this period: 0.4%

The overall percentage of authorised absence: 4.1%

Notable former pupils

Colin Bloomfield, broadcaster
Suzanne Evans, politician
Scott Quigley, footballer 
Calum Ferrie, footballer

References

Secondary schools in Shropshire
Academies in Shropshire